Kate Jon-Marie Hooper  (born 26 February 1978 in Auckland, New Zealand) is an Australian water polo player from the gold medal squad of the 2000 Summer Olympics. Hooper plays a centre forward and is from Perth in Western Australia.

See also
 List of Olympic champions in women's water polo
 List of Olympic medalists in water polo (women)

External links
 

1978 births
Living people
Australian female water polo players
Olympic gold medalists for Australia in water polo
Water polo players at the 2000 Summer Olympics
People educated at Perth College (Western Australia)
Medalists at the 2000 Summer Olympics
Recipients of the Medal of the Order of Australia
20th-century Australian women
21st-century Australian women
New Zealand emigrants to Australia
Sportspeople from Perth, Western Australia
Sportswomen from Western Australia